Cephalosphaera is a genus of flies belonging to the family Pipunculidae.

Species
Cephalosphaera acuminata (Cresson, 1911)
Cephalosphaera aequatorialis (Becker, 1919)
Cephalosphaera amboinalis (Walker, 1860)
Cephalosphaera appendiculata (Cresson, 1911)
Cephalosphaera arnaudi Rafael, 1992
Cephalosphaera baltica Carpenter & Hull, 1939
Cephalosphaera biscaynei (Cresson, 1912)
Cephalosphaera boutropis (Hardy, 1965)
Cephalosphaera brevis (Cresson, 1911)
Cephalosphaera collarti (Hardy, 1952)
Cephalosphaera cristata Rafael, 1992
Cephalosphaera eukrenaina Skevington, 1999
Cephalosphaera fairchildi Rafael, 1992
Cephalosphaera filicera (De Meyer, 1990)
Cephalosphaera furcata (Egger, 1860)
Cephalosphaera germanica Aczél, 1940
Cephalosphaera guanacastensis Rafael & Menezes, 1999
Cephalosphaera gymne De Meyer & Grootaert, 1990
Cephalosphaera hikosanus (Morakote, 1990)
Cephalosphaera hirashimai (Morakote, 1990)
Cephalosphaera honshuensis (Morakote, 1990)
Cephalosphaera immodica De Meyer & Grootaert, 1990
Cephalosphaera incomitata (Hardy, 1965)
Cephalosphaera insularis Rafael, 1996
Cephalosphaera inusitata (Hardy, 1972)
Cephalosphaera jamaicensis (Johnson, 1919)
Cephalosphaera kasparjani (Kuznetzov, 1990)
Cephalosphaera macroctenia Rafael, 1992
Cephalosphaera magnispinosus (Hardy, 1950)
Cephalosphaera maxima Hardy, 1943
Cephalosphaera miriamae Rafael, 1992
Cephalosphaera mocaensis (Hardy, 1948)
Cephalosphaera motichoorensis (Kapoor, Grewal & Sharma, 1987)
Cephalosphaera pacaraima Rafael & Rosa, 1992
Cephalosphaera pallidifemoralis (Hardy, 1952)
Cephalosphaera parthenopipis Skevington, 1999
Cephalosphaera patula (Hardy, 1972)
Cephalosphaera petila Skevington, 1999
Cephalosphaera prionotaina Skevington, 1999
Cephalosphaera procera Rafael & Menezes, 1999
Cephalosphaera reducta (De Meyer, 1990)
Cephalosphaera redunca (Hardy, 1972)
Cephalosphaera santiagoensis Rafael, 1992
Cephalosphaera sapporoensis (Morakote, 1990)
Cephalosphaera semispiralis Rafael & Rosa, 1992
Cephalosphaera sylvana (Brunetti, 1927)
Cephalosphaera tingens (Hardy, 1972)
Cephalosphaera vietnamensis (Hardy, 1972)
Cephalosphaera wauensis De Meyer & Grootaert, 1990
Cephalosphaera xanthosternum (Hardy, 1968)
Cephalosphaera zumbadoi Rafael & Menezes, 1999

References

Pipunculidae
Brachycera genera
Diptera of Europe
Diptera of Asia
Diptera of Africa
Diptera of North America
Diptera of South America
Taxa named by Günther Enderlein